Jhadhewa is a village in the Laxmangarh administrative region of Sikar district of Indian state Rajasthan. It borders Birodi Bari, Birodi Chhoti, Jogiyon ka bas and Bhoodha Ka Bas villages.

Village government

Village fall under Birodi Bari Panchayat. The current sarpanch is Rajendra Prasad Bhaskar.

Climate

Village has a hot summer, scanty rainfall, a chilly winter season and a general dryness of the air, except in the brief monsoon season. The average maximum and minimum temperatures are 28-30 and 15 - 16 degrees Celsius, respectively.

Transportation

Village is connected by a two lane asphalt road to Laxmangarh and Nawalgarh. Nawalgarh Railway station,  from village is the nearest railway station, which is  well connected to Jaipur, Delhi and other cities. Asphalt roads connect the village to surrounding villages and to Laxmangarh.

Village location

The village lies on road connecting Laxmangarh to Nawalgarh.

References

External links
 Google map view of Jhadhewa
 Details of sarpanch in Sikar district
 Voter List of Birodi Bari Panchayat samiti
 Official web page of Sikar district
 List of all the land records
 List of all villages of Rajasthan with their panchayat samiti

Villages in Sikar district